Colius is a genus of mousebirds in the family Coliidae. The four species are widely distributed in Africa. Two other African mousebirds are placed in the genus Urocolius.

The genus Colius was introduced by the French zoologist Mathurin Jacques Brisson in 1760 with the white-backed mousebird (Colius colius) as the type species.

The genus contains the following four species:

A fossil species, Colius hendeyi, was described from Early Pliocene remains found at Langebaanweg in South Africa.

Some Miocene taxa from France were previously assigned to Colius. Of these, only the Middle Miocene "Colius" palustris might plausibly belong there, but it is more often separated in Necrornis. In younger lineages like Passeriformes, extant genera (e.g. Menura and Orthonyx) were around by then, though it must be remembered that simply because two taxa are of same taxonomic rank they do not need to be of the same age. All that can be said is that while it cannot be ruled out that the modern genus Colius was around in Miocene Europe, it more likely evolved later, and probably in sub-Saharan Africa.

"Colius" archiaci, "C." consobrinus and "C." paludicola on the other hand are 3 taxa described from fragmentary remains found at Saint-Gérand-le-Puy. Their taxonomic history is convoluted, being initially described as woodpeckers and variously merged and split. Today it is believed that they might all belong to a species in the modern genus Urocolius, or at least 2 into a prehistoric genus Limnatornis.

Footnotes

References
 Mlíkovský, Jirí (2002): Cenozoic Birds of the World, Part 1: Europe. Ninox Press, Prague.  PDF fulltext

 
Coliiformes
Bird genera
Taxonomy articles created by Polbot